Hubert Wester (born 5 September 1961) is a boxer who competed internationally for Aruba.

Career
Wester competed at the 1987 Pan American Games in the Light welterweight class but lost in the first round to Daniel Cueto from Panama, the following year he competed at the 1988 Summer Olympics, where again he lost in the first round, this time against Martin Ndongo-Ebanga from Cameroon.

References

1961 births
Living people
Light-welterweight boxers
W
W
W
W
W